‘Ālewa Heights is a neighborhood of Honolulu, Hawaii. It is located on Kapālama Ridge, above Nu‘uanu Valley. "‘Ālewa" means "to float." ‘Ālewa Drive is the main road in the neighborhood. Near the top of the heights, ‘Ālewa Drive is one of the steepest streets in Honolulu. ‘Ālewa Heights is the home of Natsunoya Tea House, a historic local banqueting hall. Assets School is also located on lower ‘Ālewa Heights. ‘Ālewa Neighborhood Park and Na Pueo Park are the two parks that serve the area. Hale Kako‘o, a respite center for people with Alzheimer's disease, is adjacent to Na Pueo Park.

References

Neighborhoods in Honolulu